The 1955–56 Maccabi Tel Aviv season was the club's 50th season since its establishment in 1906, and 8th since the establishment of the State of Israel.

At the start of the season, the league which started during the previous season was completed, with the club finishing as runners-up, missing on championship in the last round. The new league season, with the top division being re-named Liga Leumit, began on 3 December 1955 and was completed on 3 June 1956, with the club winning the championship, its 8th championship title.

During the season, the club also competed in the State Cup, which was also carried over the summer break. The club eliminated Hapoel Hadera and Maccabi Haifa to reach the cup final against Hapoel Petah Tikva. Maccabi Tel Aviv won the match 3–1 and won its 8th State Cup.

Match Results

Legend

International friendly matches
During the season Maccabi Tel Aviv played two international friendly matches, losing both.

1954–55 Liga Alef
The league began on 6 February 1955, and by the time the previous season ended, only 20 rounds of matches were completed, with the final 6 rounds being played during September and October 1955.

Final table

Matches

Results by match

1955–56 Liga Leumit

Final table

Matches

Results by match

State Cup

Shapira Cup
In October and November, while the promotion playoffs and the State Cup were being played, two cup competitions were organized by Liga Leumit Clubs, the second edition of the Shapira Cup, and the Netanya 25th Anniversary Cup. Maccabi Haifa, Hapoel Petah Tikva, Maccabi Tel Aviv and Hapoel Tel Aviv played for the Shapira Cup, named after former Hapoel Tel Aviv treasurer Yosef Shapira. The competition was designed to be played as a double round-robin tournament but the competition was delayed after the teams playing only two matches each, as the third round matches were postponed due to weather conditions and then due to the 1954–55 Israel State Cup final, which involved Maccabi Tel Aviv and Hapoel Petah Tikva. As league matches started on 3 December 1955, the competition was abandoned altogether.

Table

References

 

Maccabi Tel Aviv F.C. seasons
Maccabi Tel Aviv